Pattathurani is a village located on the border of the Thanjavur and Pudukkottai districts in Tamil Nadu, India. It is 16 kilometers far east of Aranthangi.

References

Villages in Thanjavur district